Nevin Halıcı is a Turkish writer and lecturer of Turkish cuisine. She has published many cookbooks mostly in Turkish.

References and selected books

 Nevin Halıcı's Turkish Cookbook, Dorling Kindersley Publishers Ltd, 1989, 

Turkish food writers
Turkish women writers
Year of birth missing (living people)
Living people
Gazi University alumni